Raghavendra Nagar is a suburb of Mysore city in Karnataka state of India.

Location
Ragjavemdra Nagar is located on the eastern side of Mysore city.  It is an important residential locality.  A large number of government organizations and schools are located here.

Post office
There is a post office at Raghavendra Nagar and the pin code is 570011.

Important landmarks
 State Bank of Mysore
 Kendriya Vidyalaya Regional Office
 Police Headquarters
 Police Guest House
 Male Mahadeshwara Temple
 Shree Vidhya Ganapathi Temple
 Shobadaya  Hospital 
 BSNL Exchange  Office

Schools
 Kendriya Vidyalaya, Mysore

See also
 Mysore East

References

Suburbs of Mysore